Douglas Lane is a lane converted for pedestrian use in the core of Hong Kong's Central District. It runs north-south from Des Voeux Road Central to Queen's Road Central. though the street name is continued in Douglas Street which continues to its north across Des Voeux Road Central all the way to Connaught Road Central. The lane is named for Hong Kong Tai-pan Douglas Lapraik.

History 

The lane is named after Hong Kong Tai-pan Douglas Lapraik whose dockyard and subsequent Douglas Steamship Company wharf was once located in the area now reclaimed and the site of Exchange Square. The lane has also been adapted to serve as an outdoor bazaar. Douglas Lane has been dubbed as a Hawker Blackspot for Central and Western District meaning that the Food and Environmental Hygiene Department would give no warning to hawkers at the location before taking prosecution actions against them if they are caught.

Location 

Douglas Lane runs a distance of around 350 ft between and perpendicular to Des Voeux Road Central and Queen's Road Central.

Current buildings 

 King Fook Building
 Prosperity Tower
 Yu To Sang Building
 Eubank Plaza
 Chiu Lung Building
 Bangkok Bank Building

See also 

 Douglas Lapraik

References 

Roads on Hong Kong Island
Central, Hong Kong
British Hong Kong
Ladder streets in Hong Kong